Peter Clark (born 10 December 1979) is an English retired professional footballer who made over 150 league appearances as a defender.

Career
Born in Romford, Clark began his career as an apprentice at Arsenal, but he never made a league appearance for the Gunners. He signed for Carlisle United in 1998, making 79 league appearances. He appeared in the famous Jimmy Glass game against Plymouth Argyle, in which the goalkeeper scored in the 94th minute to keep Carlisle United in the Football League. He then signed for Stockport County, where he made 72 league appearances. While at Stockport, Clark spent time on loan at Mansfield Town, where he made 4 league appearances. After leaving Stockport in 2003, Clark spent one season at Northampton Town, where he made 6 league appearances. Clark retired from football in 2004.

References

External links

1979 births
Living people
English footballers
Arsenal F.C. players
Carlisle United F.C. players
Stockport County F.C. players
Mansfield Town F.C. players
Northampton Town F.C. players
English Football League players
Association football defenders